Oonopoides is a genus of spiders in the family Oonopidae. It was first described in 1940 by Bryant. , it contains 22 North American species.

Species

Oonopoides comprises the following species:
Oonopoides anoxus (Chickering, 1970)
Oonopoides bolivari Dumitrescu & Georgescu, 1987
Oonopoides cartago Platnick & Berniker, 2013
Oonopoides catemaco Platnick & Berniker, 2013
Oonopoides cavernicola Dumitrescu & Georgescu, 1983
Oonopoides chicanna Platnick & Berniker, 2013
Oonopoides cristo Platnick & Berniker, 2013
Oonopoides endicus (Chickering, 1971)
Oonopoides habanensis Dumitrescu & Georgescu, 1983
Oonopoides hondo Platnick & Berniker, 2013
Oonopoides humboldti Dumitrescu & Georgescu, 1983
Oonopoides iviei Platnick & Berniker, 2013
Oonopoides kaplanae Platnick & Berniker, 2013
Oonopoides maxillaris Bryant, 1940
Oonopoides mitchelli (Gertsch, 1977)
Oonopoides orghidani Dumitrescu & Georgescu, 1983
Oonopoides pallidulus (Chickering, 1951)
Oonopoides pilosus Dumitrescu & Georgescu, 1983
Oonopoides secretus (Gertsch, 1936)
Oonopoides singularis Dumitrescu & Georgescu, 1983
Oonopoides upala Platnick & Berniker, 2013
Oonopoides zullinii Brignoli, 1974

References

Oonopidae
Araneomorphae genera
Spiders of North America